Perittia echiella is a moth of the family Elachistidae. It is found on the Iberian Peninsula, Sardinia and Sicily and in Greece.

The wingspan is about 11 mm.

The larvae feed on Echium decaisnei, Echium lusitanicum, Echium plantagineum, Podonosma orientalis and Symphytum species. They mine the leaves of their host plant. The mine starts as an undulating epidermal corridor. Later, it widens into an elliptic blotch. The blotch has two levels. A silken cocoon is attached to the roof of the upper floor. The frass is deposited in a thin, continuous pale brown line. Larvae can be found from March onwards.

References

Moths described in 1902
Elachistidae
Moths of Europe
Taxa named by Joseph de Joannis